Thomas Bourgin (23 December 1986 – 11 January 2013) was a French motorcycle racer. He was in 68th place in the overall ranking of his first Dakar Rally.

Bourgin was born in Saint Etienne and had been racing since 2009, when he took part in the Morocco Rally, followed by a 4th place in the 2011 Africa Race and a 7th-place finish in the Tunisia Rally.

Death 
Bourgin died in a traffic collision on 11 January 2013.

References 

1987 births
2013 deaths
French motorcycle racers
Motorcycle racers who died while racing
Dakar Rally drivers